Robert William Davies (23 April 1925 – 13 April 2021), better known as R. W. Davies or Bob Davies, was a British historian, writer and professor of Soviet Economic Studies at the University of Birmingham.

Obtaining his PhD in 1954, Davies was promoted to full professor and made chair of the Centre for Russian and East European Studies (CREES) at the University of Birmingham in 1965. He retired from active teaching in 1989.

A collaborator and co-author with historian E. H. Carr on two volumes of his 14-volume History of Soviet Russia, Davies is best known for having carried Carr's work forward into the 1930s with seven additional volumes of economic history under the general title The Industrialisation of Soviet Russia.

Biography

Early years
During World War II, Davies served in the Royal Air Force from 1943 to 1946. He was stationed in the Middle East from 1945 to 1946.

Academic career
Davies obtained his Bachelor of Arts degree from the School of Slavonic and East European Studies at the University of London in 1950. He subsequently attended the University of Birmingham, where he obtained his PhD in 1954 in Commerce and Social Science under the supervision of historian Alexander Baykov.

After completing his PhD, Davies was appointed to a post as assistant lecturer at the Institute of Soviet Studies at the University of Glasgow, where he would remain until his return to the University of Birmingham in 1956. At Birmingham Davies held a succession of academic titles, including Research Fellow, Lecturer, and Senior Lecturer. Davies was appointed a professor of Soviet Economic Studies by the University of Birmingham in 1965.

In 1963, Davies was named the first director of the Centre for Russian and East European Studies (CREES) at the University of Birmingham — a post which he would retain until 1978. Davies retired in 1989 and was named Senior Fellow and Emeritus Professor by the university upon his departure from active teaching.

His research contributions in the history of the Soviet Union are recognized by the peers. Davies' papers are housed in the Special Collections department of the University of Birmingham. A temporary register of the Davies' collection, contained in 70 archival boxes, is available.

Davies died in April 2021 at the age of 95.

Works

Monographs 
 The Development of the Soviet Budgetary System. Cambridge: Cambridge University Press, 1958.
 Science and the Soviet Economy: An Inaugural Lecture Delivered in the University of Birmingham on 18th January 1967. Birmingham: University of Birmingham, 1967.
 A History of Soviet Russia: Foundations of a Planned Economy, 1926—1929: Volume 1. In Two Parts. With E.H. Carr. London: Macmillan, 1969.
 The Soviet Economic Crisis of 1931—1933. Birmingham: Centre for Russian and East European Studies, 1976.
 The Emergence of the Soviet Economic System, 1927—1934. Birmingham: Centre for Russian and East European Studies, 1977.
 The Soviet Union. Co-Editor, with Denis J.B. Shaw. London:George Allen & Unwin, 1978
 Soviet Industrial Production, 1928—1937: The Rival Estimates. Birmingham: Centre for Russian and East European Studies, 1978.
 Capital Investment and Capital Stock in the USSR, 1928—1940: Soviet and Western Estimates. Birmingham: Centre for Russian and East European Studies, 1982.
 The Socialist Market: A Debate in Soviet Industry, 1932-33. Birmingham: Centre for Russian and East European Studies, 1982.
 Edward Hallett Carr, 1892—1982. London: British Academy, 1984.
 Materials for a Balance of the Soviet National Economy, 1928—1930. Co-Editor, with Stephen G. Wheatcroft. Cambridge: Cambridge University Press, 1985.
 Soviet Defence Industries During the First Five-Year Plan: Supplement. Birmingham: Centre for Russian and East European Studies, 1987.
 Soviet History in the Gorbachev Revolution: The First Phase. Birmingham: Centre for Russian and East European Studies, 1987.
 Soviet History in the Gorbachev Revolution. Bloomington, IN: Indiana University Press, 1989 ISBN 0-253-31604-9
 Soviet official statistics on industrial production, capital stock and capital investment, 1928-41. With J.M. Cooper and M.J. Ilič. Birmingham: Centre for Russian and East European Studies, 1991.
 From Tsarism to the New Economic Policy: Continuity and Change in the Economy of the USSR. Editor. Ithaca, NY: Cornell University Press, 1991.
 The Economic Transformation of the Soviet Union, 1913—1945. Co-Editor, with Stephen G. Wheatcroft. Cambridge: Cambridge University Press, 1994. ISBN 0-521-45152-3
 Soviet History in the Yeltsin Era. London: Macmillan, 1997.
 Soviet Economic Development from Lenin to Khrushchev. Cambridge: Cambridge University Press, 1998. ISBN 0-521-62260-3
 The Industrialisation of Soviet Russia
 The Industrialisation of Soviet Russia, Volume 1: The Socialist Offensive: The Collectivisation of Soviet Agriculture, 1929—1930. Cambridge, MA: Harvard University Press, 1980.
 The Industrialisation of Soviet Russia, Volume 2: The Soviet Collective Farm, 1929—1930. Cambridge, MA: Harvard University Press, 1980.
 The Industrialisation of Soviet Russia, Volume 3: The Soviet Economy in Turmoil, 1929—1930. Cambridge, MA: Harvard University Press, 1989.
 The Industrialisation of Soviet Russia, Volume 4: Crisis and Progress in the Soviet Economy, 1931—1933. Basingstoke: Macmillan, 1996.
 The Industrialisation of Soviet Russia, Volume 5: The Years of Hunger: Soviet Agriculture, 1931—1933. With Stephen Wheatcroft. Basingstoke: Palgrave, 2004.
 The Industrialisation of Soviet Russia, Volume 6: The Years of Progress: The Soviet Economy, 1934—1936. With Oleg Khlevniuk and Stephen G. Wheatcroft. Basingstoke: Palgrave Macmillan, 2014.
 The Industrialisation of Soviet Russia, Volume 7: The Soviet Economy and the Approach of War, 1937–1939. With Oleg Khlevniuk, Robert W. Harrison and Stephen G. Wheatcroft.  London: Palgrave Macmillan, 2018.
 The Stalin-Kaganovich Correspondence, 1931-36. Co-Editor. New Haven, Yale University Press, 2003, ISBN в 0-300-09367-5

Footnotes

External links

 "Papers of R.W. Davies: Preliminary Handlist," University of Birmingham, Special Collections.

1925 births
2021 deaths
Academics of the University of Birmingham
Academics of the University of Glasgow
Alumni of the University of Birmingham
Alumni of the University of London
British historians
Royal Air Force personnel of World War II
Writers about the Soviet Union
People from London